The Seven Thunders are mentioned in the biblical Book of Revelation (see Events of Revelation (Chapter 10)). The term may also refer to:

Seven Thunders (film), a 1957 war film
"Seven Thunders", a track from Breaking the Chains (Dokken album)
Seven Thunders, the last volume of South African author Sarah Millin's diary

Seven in the Book of Revelation